Burnt Ranch is a historical monument near (and original site of) South Pass City, Wyoming.

External links
 Wyoming State Historic Preservation Office

Geography of Fremont County, Wyoming